AS03 (for "Adjuvant System 03") is the trade name for a squalene-based immunologic adjuvant used in various vaccine products by GlaxoSmithKline (GSK). It is used, for example, in GSK's A/H1N1 pandemic flu vaccine Pandemrix. It is also in Arepanrix and the Q-pan for H5N1 influenza.A dose of AS03 adjuvant contains
 10.69 mg squalene
 11.86 mg DL-α-tocopherol
 4.86 mg polysorbate 80

In the 2009 influenza pandemic, vaccines containing AS03 delivered a stronger immunogene response against pandemic H1N1 influenza than non-adjuvanted vaccines, despite their containing lower levels of viral antigen.

Small observational studies reported from Finland and Sweden in 2012, and larger studies from Ireland reported in 2012, and reported in each of England, Norway and France in 2013, found an association between narcolepsy and an A(H1N1)pdm09 vaccine that used AS03 adjuvant; the rates ranged from one in 16,000 doses to one in 50,000 doses.  As of 2016 it was unclear whether or not the adjuvant was responsible; other suspected causes include genetic susceptibility, exposure to A(H1N1)pdm09, manufacturing impurities, and combinations of these factors.

See also
 2009 flu pandemic
 MF59 – another squalene-based adjuvant by Novartis
 AS04 – another adjuvant by GSK

References

Adjuvants